Broniewo may refer to the following places:
Broniewo, Inowrocław County in Kuyavian-Pomeranian Voivodeship (north-central Poland)
Broniewo, Radziejów County in Kuyavian-Pomeranian Voivodeship (north-central Poland)
Broniewo, Nakło County in Kuyavian-Pomeranian Voivodeship (north-central Poland)
Broniewo, Pomeranian Voivodeship (north Poland)